Anabar Bay is a gulf in the Laptev Sea. Lat 74° 30' and long 113° 15'. It stretches between the eastern cape off the mouth of the Anabar River and the Nordvik Peninsula. Nordvik Bay lies further west of it, beyond Cape Paksa at the tip of the peninsula.

Geography
Anabar Bay opens towards the north and it is about 76 km in width. It includes the estuary of the Anabar River which is about 40 km long with an average width of 10 km. Three rivers have their mouths at the beginning of the estuary, the Anabar in the center, the Uele from the east, and the Suolama from the southwest.

The climate is Arctic and extremely severe, with prolonged, bitter winters so that the bay is covered by ice most of the year.

Anabar Bay and its surrounding area belongs to the Sakha Republic administrative division of the Russian Federation.

Fauna
The Sibirskaya ryapushka fish often arrives in great numbers to the mouth of river Anabar.

History

Baron Eduard Von Toll explored the Anabar Bay region in 1893. At that time it was a very little-known area of the Russian Arctic. He was the first one to map the plateau between the Anabar and Popigay Rivers.

There were two settlements in the Anabar Bay area, during Soviet times. One was Khorgo, at the mouth of the bay, and the other Tostuya, further inland at the point where the estuarine area begins.

See also
Russian polar expedition of 1900–1902
Arctic Ocean Hydrographic Expedition
Russian Hydrographic Service

References

Geology
Natural History and pictures

External links
 The Siberian Sea Road: The Work of the Russian Hydrographical Expedition to the Arctic 1910-1915  
 Записки Харитона Лаптева (Exploration of the area)
 Pictures of the Bay

Gulfs of Russia
Gulfs of the Laptev Sea
Bays of the Sakha Republic
Bays of the Laptev Sea
North Siberian Lowland